Springfield High School is a public high school located in Springfield, Tennessee, United States.

Campus
Prior to 1925, the school was located on Main Street on the property where "The Center", the recreational center in Springfield, is located.  In 1925, the school moved to the former campus of Peoples-Tucker School, which had been closed.  The school remained on that campus until 1982 when it was moved to Highway 76 East at its present location.

Organization

Springfield High School consists of three main buildings: the main building, the vocational building, and the workout room.

The main building is divided into four separate halls (A, B, C, D, M, and V).

A-Hall contains computer classes, some mathematics classes, some Technology Department, the History Department, and the Guidance Department,
B-Hall contains the Social Sciences Department, some of the Art Department, and the English Department, in addition to most of the Foreign Language Department and the Yearbook Room.
C-Hall contains most of the Art Department, most of the Music Department, some of the Foreign Language Department, 
D-Hall contains the Mathematics Department, Auditorium, Choir, in addition to most of the Technological/Business Department.
E-Hall contains the Science Department and the Theater control Balcony 
M-Hall Contains most of the English Department, the library, Few Mathematics classes, Guidance Department and leads to the cafeteria. 
The Vocational Building (V-Hall) contains Auto Mechanics, Agri-science, Culinary, Nursing, Construction and Criminal Justice Departments

Renovations and additions
Efforts to expand the school, merging the main and vocational buildings, began in early 2007. Among the additions to the school were a multi-story extension of B-Hall, a new Lecture Hall, a new gymnasium, and new offices. Construction finished in 2009.

On November 16, 2016, construction began on a new on-campus football and soccer field, which was completed in time to host its first game on August 25, 2017 against Clarksville. Prior to this the school played home games at nearby Springfield Middle School.

Athletics
The football team began in 1911.  The school's former football stadium, opened in 1939, is named for coach W. Boyce Smith, who coached from 1928-1971 and compiled a record of 288-166-34 (a winning percentage of 69.6%).

The 1993 Yellow Jacket football team won the TSSAA state championship in Class 3A, defeating McMinn Central 28-6 at Vanderbilt Stadium, to finish with a record of 13-2.

In December 2017, Springfield High School played in the 4-A State Championship at Tennessee Tech. They were beaten by Greeneville High School with a 54-13 score.

In December 2019, Springfield High School played in the 4-A State Championship at Tennessee Tech. They were defeated by Elizabethton High School with a score of 30-6.

References

4.  TSSAA Championship 4-A Results: https://tssaa.org/article/2019-bluecross-bowl-rewind

External links

Public high schools in Tennessee
Schools in Robertson County, Tennessee
1982 establishments in Tennessee